Elachista collitella is a moth of the family Elachistidae. It is found in Great Britain, Spain, France, Italy, Switzerland, Austria, Germany, the Czech Republic, Slovakia, Hungary, Romania and Turkey.

The head is whitish. Forewings are whitish ; costa towards base fuscous, with traces of a basal fascia; two broad partially ill-defined light yellow-ochreous fasciae in middle and at 3/4, more or less fuscous on costa, with some scattered black scales ; dark line of cilia appearing truncate at apex. Hindwings are grey.

The larvae feed on sheep's fescue (Festuca ovina), crested hair-grass (Koeleria macrantha) and common meadow-grass (Poa pratensis). They mine the leaves of their host plant.

References

collitella
Leaf miners
Moths described in 1843
Moths of Europe
Taxa named by Philogène Auguste Joseph Duponchel